Cybele, minor planet designation 65 Cybele, is one of the largest asteroids in the Solar System. It is located in the outer asteroid belt. It is thought to be a remnant primordial body. It gives its name to the Cybele group of asteroids that orbit outward from the Sun from the 2:1 orbital resonance with Jupiter. The X-type asteroid has a relatively short rotation period of 6.0814 hours. It was discovered by Wilhelm Tempel in 1861, and named after Cybele, the earth goddess.

Discovery and naming 

Cybele was discovered on 8 March 1861, by German astronomer Wilhelm Tempel from the Marseilles Observatory in southeastern France. A minor controversy arose from its naming process. Tempel had awarded the honour of naming the asteroid to Carl August von Steinheil in recognition of his achievements in telescope production. Von Steinheil elected to name it "Maximiliana" after the reigning monarch Maximilian II of Bavaria. At the time, asteroids were conventionally given classical names, and a number of astronomers protested this contemporary appellation. The name Cybele was chosen instead, referring to the Phrygian goddess of the earth. (The previously discovered 45 Eugenia, 54 Alexandra, and 64 Angelina had nevertheless also been given non-classical names; 64 Angelina had also been discovered by Tempel, but its name stood despite similar protests.)

Physical characteristics 

The first Cybelian stellar occultation was observed on 17 October 1979, in the Soviet Union. The asteroid appeared to have an irregular shape, with the longest chord being measured as 245 km, closely matching results determined by the IRAS satellite in 1983 (see below). During the same 1979 occultation, a hint of a possible 11 km wide minor-planet moon at 917 km distance was detected, but has since never been corroborated. As of 2017, neither the Asteroid Lightcurve Data Base nor Johnstons archive consider Cybele to be a binary asteroid.

Diameter estimates 

Mean-diameter estimates for Cybele range between 218.56 and 300.54 kilometers. According to observations by the Infrared Astronomical Satellite IRAS in 1983, the asteroid has a diameter of 237.26 km. The NEOWISE mission of NASA's Wide-field Infrared Survey Explorer gave a diameter of 218.56 and 276.58 km. The largest estimates of 300.54 km is from the Japanese Akari satellite. In 2004, Müller estimated Cybele using thermophysical modelling (TPM) to have dimensions of 302 × 290 × 232 km, which corresponds to a mean-diameter of 273.0 km.

Spectrum 

Examination of the asteroid's infrared spectrum shows an absorption feature that is similar to the one present in the spectrum of 24 Themis. This can be explained by the presence of water ice. The asteroid may be covered in a layer of fine silicate dust mixed with small amounts of water-ice and organic solids.

Recent occultations 

On August 24, 2008, Cybele occulted 2UCAC 24389317, a 12.7-magnitude star in the constellation Ophiuchus which showed a long axis of at least 294 km. On 11 October 2009, Cybele occulted a 13.4-magnitude star in the constellation Aquarius.

Notes

References

External links 
 Asteroid Lightcurve Database (LCDB), query form (info )
 Dictionary of Minor Planet Names, Google books
 Asteroids and comets rotation curves – (17) Thetis at Observatoire de Genève, Raoul Behrend
 Discovery Circumstances: Numbered Minor Planets (1)-(5000) – Minor Planet Center
 
 

000065
Discoveries by Wilhelm Tempel
Named minor planets
000065
000065
000065
000065
18610308